Megalobulimus paranaguensis is a species of air-breathing land snail, a terrestrial gastropod mollusk in the family Strophocheilidae. They are native to South America and are known for being large and having a long lifespan. The survival rate of males is 96.7% and similarly high for other members of the species. Their eggs most often hatch in August and September and take around 51 days to hatch.

References

External links
 Fontenelle J. H. & Miranda M. S. (2012). "The use of outer lip in age estimation of Megalobulimus paranaguensis (Gastropoda, Pulmonata)". Strombus 19: 15-22.
 Fontenelle J. H. & Miranda M. S. (2017). "Aspects of biology of Megalobulimus paranaguensis (Gastropoda, Acavoidea) in the coastal plain of the Brazilian southeast". Iheringia, Sér. Zool. 107. 
 Miranda M. S. & Fontenelle J. H. (2015). "Population dynamics of Megalobulimus paranaguensis in the Brazilian southeast coast". Zoologia 32: 463-468. .
 Morretes F. L. (1954). "Sôbre Megalobulimus paranaguensis Pilsbry & Ihering". Arquivos do Museu Paranaense 10: 343-344.

Strophocheilidae
Taxa named by Henry Augustus Pilsbry
Taxa named by Hermann von Ihering
Gastropods described in 1900